Cleora fraterna is a moth of the  family Geometridae. It is found in China, Taiwan, Nepal, India and Bhutan.

References

Moths described in 1888
Cleora
Moths of Asia